R. nepalensis may refer to:

 Rana nepalensis, a frog native to Asia
 Rodgersia nepalensis, a perennial plant
 Roscoea nepalensis, a perennial plant
 Roseomonas nepalensis, a Gram-negative bacterium
 Rubus nepalensis, an evergreen raspberry
 Rumex nepalensis, a perennial herb
 Russula nepalensis, a mycorrhizal mushroom